Tony David  is an American college baseball coach, head coach of the NCAA Division I Southern Conference's Samford Bulldogs. He was the associate head coach and recruiting coordinator at Samford from 2006 to 2021. Prior to Samford, David was an assistant coach at South Alabama in 2004, where he played college baseball from 1994-1995.

Head coaching record

References

Living people
South Alabama Jaguars baseball players
South Alabama Jaguars baseball coaches
Samford Bulldogs baseball coaches
Year of birth missing (living people)
Baseball coaches from Mississippi